South Bay, also known by other names, is a bay and adjacent beach near Hengchun in Pingtung County, Taiwan. It is part of Kenting National Park.

Names

History
The bay used to be a whaling area during the Japanese rule. It is still home to small fishing villages.

Geography
The bay is bound on the west by Cape Maobitou and on the east by Cape Eluanbi.

Facilities
The area around the beach provides facilities such as changing rooms, toilets, rental and sale of swimming equipment, restaurants and parking. Common activities at the beach and its surrounding areas are swimming, surfing, snorkeling, scuba diving etc.

Transportation
The beach is accessible by bus from Xinzuoying and Kaohsiung Stations, run by the Taiwan Railways Administration.

See also
 List of tourist attractions in Taiwan

References

Citations

Bibliography

 . 

Beaches of Taiwan
Landforms of Pingtung County
Tourist attractions in Pingtung County
Bays of Taiwan